Aberford railway station served the village of Aberford, West Yorkshire, England, from 1837 to 1924 on the Aberford Railway.

History 
The station opened on 25 February 1837 by the Aberford Railway. Early services were carried by horse and wagon, also known as the 'High Flyer'. When George Hudson removed the passenger services on the Leeds and Selby Railway, horse-drawn buses were used instead to get to Leeds, forcing the passenger services to be withdrawn on the line in 1840. When Hudson lost power in 1850, the services resumed. The first steam locomotive was used on the line in 1870. The station closed in March 1924.

References

External links 

Disused railway stations in West Yorkshire
Railway stations in Great Britain opened in 1837
Railway stations in Great Britain closed in 1924
1837 establishments in England
1924 disestablishments in England
railway station